Broadhead is a surname. Notable people with the surname include:

Dan Broadhead, Scottish footballer
James Broadhead (1819–1898), American lawyer
Theodore Henry Broadhead (1767–1820), British Member of Parliament 
Sir Theodore Brinckman, 1st Baronet (1798–1880), British Member of Parliament, born Theodore Henry Lavington Broadhead, son of Theodore Henry Broadhead
Wilfred Broadhead (20th century), British cricketer
William Broadhead (1815–1879), British trade unionist
William Henry Broadhead (1848–1931), British theatre developer

See also
Brodhead (surname)